Halo headlights (also known as halos, corona rings or angel eyes because of the distinctive arrangement of lights placed in a circular pattern) are automotive front lighting units with luminous rings inside the headlight assembly. Introduced in 2000 by BMW, halos were originally typical of this automaker's cars but soon became a popular customization option to enhance any vehicle's front end appearance.

History

Since the time when early headlight technology was represented by an acetylene lamp with a reflecting mirror, headlights have evolved into the high-tech units that both create high-impact illumination and provide a way to customize the look of a vehicle.

Although composite headlight assemblies became widely used only in the 1980s, their bulky construction which utilized parabolic reflectors didn't allow for the freedom to create intricate designs. With an increasing use of less cumbersome projector lenses in the 2000s, automakers could implement innovative headlamp designs, including halo rings.

Halo headlights were originally designed and first used by BMW on the 2001 BMW 5 Series (E39), a luxury sports sedan which soon entered Car and Driver's "10Best list". This was a breakthrough: halo headlights not only served as daytime running lights, but also created a revolutionary look that gave a sharp stance to a vehicle's front. BMW's inspiration behind their "angel eyes", had originally come as an homage to earlier BMW vehicles. The halo lights had been based on typical BMW headlight design, such as that of the cult classic E30 3 Series. 

The BMW E39 series halo headlights are a popular aftermarket modification for this model, often referred to as "angel eyes" due to the halo-shaped LED lighting around the headlight. These headlights can enhance the appearance of the car and provide improved visibility and safety on the road. 

Typically, the halo headlight kit includes replacement headlight assemblies with built-in LED rings, wiring harnesses, and control modules. Installation usually requires some basic wiring and electrical knowledge, as well as some basic tools.

It's important to note that while halo headlights can be a great addition to your BMW E39, it's important to ensure that the installation is done properly and in compliance with local laws and regulations. Some jurisdictions may have restrictions on the use of aftermarket lighting, or specific requirements for headlight color and intensity. Be sure to check with your local authorities or a trusted automotive professional before making any modifications to your vehicle's lighting.

Halo headlights were called corona rings by BMW. Through constant improvement in technology, halo headlights could serve as daytime running lights (DRL) and also as evening city lights. Originally powering their halo headlights with halogen bulbs that used a fiber optic system to transmit the light along the ring channel, BMW soon replaced this source of illumination with super-bright energy-saving LEDs that powered corona light rings.

Modern BMW-designed halo rings are part of the BMW bi-xenon headlights. A signature element that served to distinguish BMW vehicles on the road, halo headlights were soon borrowed by other automakers. For instance, the Chevrolet Camaro and the Chevrolet Impala were equipped with halo-ring headlights.

Commenting on the new 2014 Chevrolet Impala design that utilized LED halo rings, Steve McCabe, the lead creative designer for Impala, said: “Impala’s new-look headlamps required a significant amount of attention to detail... As a result they help give the car a premium appearance.”

Types

There are several types of halo rings: 

 Regular halo rings utilized by most automakers are illuminated by one or two incandescent bulbs that produce the distinctive “angel eyes” effect by creating bright and dark spots inside the enclosed ring.
 CCFL halo headlights use small cold cathode fluorescent lighting tubes filled with gas that burn cool, eliminating hotspots and discoloration. These rings are brighter and whiter than conventional halo rings that use incandescent bulbs.
 LED halo rings use bright light-emitting diodes. Because of a unique nature of LED lights that are made of layers of semiconductor material and can emit light of various colors depending on how these materials are chemically grouped, LED halo rings can change the light color on demand. Some colors fail to meet federal standards and are not street legal, intended for off-road use only.

References 

Automotive lamps
Vehicle technology